Oliver James Wilcox (September 1, 1869 – December 2, 1917) was a farmer and political figure in Ontario, Canada. He represented Essex North in the House of Commons of Canada from 1909 to 1917 as a Conservative.

He was born in South Woodslee, Ontario, the son of John Wilcox and Mary Totten. In 1892, he married Mary Rachel Hamilton. Wilcox was reeve of Rochester Township. He served as president of North Essex Farmers Insurance Company. He was first elected to the House of Commons in a 1909 by-election held after Robert Franklin Sutherland was named to the Supreme Court of Ontario; he was reelected in 1911. Wilcox did not run for reelection in 1917 and died later that year in Essex at the age of 48.

References

Members of the House of Commons of Canada from Ontario
Conservative Party of Canada (1867–1942) MPs
1869 births
1917 deaths